3GG is an Australian commercial radio station based in Warragul, Victoria owned by Capital Radio Network. Formerly owned and operated by Resonate Broadcasting and prior, RG Capital and Macquarie Regional RadioWorks, it was acquired by the Capital Radio Network in February 2015.

History
3GG first went to air in 1937 as 3UL, named after the town from which it then broadcast; Warragul. 3UL's founder was Vic Dinenny. Dinenny had earlier operated 3YB as a mobile station, broadcasting from various towns around Victoria. As more and more rural stations opened in Victoria, the concept of a mobile station became less practical. Therefore, Dinenny applied for and received licences for two non-mobile (or conventional) stations, one in Warrnambool, which kept the 3YB call sign, and the other being 3UL in Warragul.

Within a few years of opening, 3UL became part of the Argus Broadcasting Services network, along with 3YB Warrnambool and 3SR Shepparton. This Victorian rural radio network was operated by The Argus (Melbourne), then a daily newspaper. When the Argus closed in January 1957, their radio network evolved into the Associated Broadcasting Company which owned 3UL until it was sold to Regional Communications Pty Ltd in 1982. In 1990 the station was purchased by two private shareholders. Ace Radio Broadcasters purchased 3UL in 1995.

In November 1989, 3UL moved premises from Warragul to Traralgon, in the Latrobe Valley, and changed its callsign to 3GG. Under Program Director, Steve Woods, 3GG became the number one station in the listening area.

After ten years, 3GG returned to Warragul. In 2002, owners RG Capital launched sister station Sea FM. In 2004, both 3GG and Sea FM were purchased by the then-new Macquarie Regional RadioWorks – the only change being to Sea FM, which was rebranded as Star FM.

Because of changes in media law, and following the purchase of Southern Cross Ten by Macquarie Southern Cross Media, either Sea FM or 3GG would have to be sold - the latter was sold to Resonate Broadcasting, a new entity operated by radio gurus Guy Dobson & Rex Morris, both a part of Austereo. Due to Resonate's Austereo connections - and following the merger of Southern Cross Media Group and Austereo - the station was closely aligned to the LocalWorks network.

In February 2015, 3GG was acquired by the Capital Radio Network. As a result, the station shifted music formats from adult contemporary to classic hits, in line with other network stations.

Transmitter and studios
While the transmitter location has always remained on Brandy Creek Road just north of Warragul, the studio location has over the years changed from Warragul to Traralgon and back to Warragul at its current location of 7/61 Smith St Warragul. Its reception can be heard in Melbourne and Geelong.

Notable presenters

Current
Local programming is produced and broadcast from 3GG's studios in Smith Street Warragul 24/7 with announcers presenting from 5:30am-7pm on weekdays and 6am-6pm on weekends.

The station's presenters include Andrew Deak, Trent McCurdy, Macka Dixon & Jenni Birchill.

Former

Donald Kilgour (Member for Shepparton)
John Vertigan (retired)
Madeleine Burke
Ron Bond
Peter Leslie (2DU)
Ken Austin
Andy Johns
Daniel Gunn (SA-FM, PM-FM, 96FM, 91.7 The Wave)
Stuart Baker (soundaudiosolutions.com.au)
Bob Cornish
Brendan Atch
Peter Landy
David Font (2AAA)
Max Taylor
Leigh Drew (3AW, 3AK)
Gary Nicholls
David Johns
Mike Nicholls
Malcolm T. Elliott
Graham Lever
John Doherty
Mark Vale
Tony Osler
Peter O'Callaghan (3MP)
Peter Grace
Ashley Malone
Greg Allen (TRFM / Gold 1242)

Ron Burke (3AW)
Steve Murphy (2GB)
Andrew Ogilvie
Toni Pippicelli (Nova 969)
Diana Simons (Australian Traffic Network)
Pat Penneta (3AW)
Amanda Penneta (3AW)
Fifi Box (Fox FM)
James Clothier
Darren Harding
Kate Neubaur
Jon Martin (analogue/digital conversion '97)
Steve O'Halloran
Lauren Setches (ACE Radio Hamilton)
Brendan McIntosh (ACE Radio Hamilton)
Mike Harris
Nick Swanson
Steve Woods (MCM Media)
Mark Vale
Simon Diaz (smoothfm 91.5)
Belinda King
Steve Mac (McNamara) (Light FM)
Mark Hyland (95.5 K-Rock)
John Blackman (Magic 1278)
Jeff Cooper
Mark Skurnik
Phil Dickson
Matt Cameron 
Rod Bear
Chris Guy

References

External links
 
 Capital Radio Network Website

Radio stations established in 1937
Radio stations in Victoria
Classic hits radio stations in Australia
Capital Radio Network